Joseph Michael Ward (born February 11, 1961 in Sarnia, Ontario) is a former Canadian ice hockey player. Ward played his junior hockey with the Seattle Breakers of the WHL. And was the 22nd pick by the Colorado Rockies in the 1980 NHL Entry Draft. He would go on to play four games for the Rockies that year, however, he would never make it back to the NHL. He is the son of Don Ward.

Career statistics

Regular season and playoffs

External links
 
Hockey Draft Central

1961 births
Living people
Canadian ice hockey centres
Colorado Rockies (NHL) draft picks
Colorado Rockies (NHL) players
Fort Worth Texans players
Ice hockey people from Ontario
Muskegon Mohawks players
Seattle Breakers players
Sportspeople from Sarnia
Wichita Wind players